Weird Science is the name of:

 Weird Science (film), a 1985 film directed by John Hughes
 Weird Science (TV series), a television series based on the film
 "Weird Science" (song), the theme song to the film and the TV series by Oingo Boingo
 Weird Science (comic), a 1950s comic book published by EC Comics
 Weird Science (group), a group consisting of Blake Miller and Steve Aoki
 "Weird Science" (D:TNG episode), an episode from season two of Degrassi: The Next Generation

See also
Pseudoscience
Weerd Science, pseudonym for rapper Josh Eppard (b. 1979)